The 1936 World Table Tennis Championships – Swaythling Cup (men's team) was the tenth edition of the men's team championship. 

Austria defeated Romania 5–4 in the final to win the gold medal. Four teams tied for third place due to the fact that there was no play off to determine a single bronze medal winner.

Swaythling Cup tables

Group 1

Group 2

Final

See also
List of World Table Tennis Championships medalists

References

-